Šaš  is a village in central Croatia, in the municipality of Sunja, Sisak-Moslavina County. It is located in the Banija region.

History

Demographics
According to the 2011 census, the village of Šaš has 307 inhabitants. This represents 41.77% of its pre-war population. 

The 1991 census recorded that 81.77% of the village population were ethnic Serbs (601/735),  10.75% were ethnic Croats (79/735), 5.44% were Yugoslavs (40/735) while 2.04% were of other ethnicity (15/735).

Notable natives and residents

References

Populated places in Sisak-Moslavina County
Serb communities in Croatia